Paraloricaria agastor is a species of armored catfish native to Argentina and Paraguay where it is found in the Paraguay River basin.  This species grows to a length of  SL.

References
 

Loricariini
Fish of South America
Fish of Argentina
Fish of Paraguay
Taxa named by Isaäc J. H. Isbrücker
Fish described in 1979